The Sirmpa is a Greek folk dance (hasaposerviko) from Leros. The dance originated in the Middle Ages as a battle mime with swords performed by the Greek butchers guild, which adopted it from the military of Byzantine era. There are similar folkloric dance tunes known as  Hopak in  Ukraine.

See also

Greek dances
Hasapiko
Sirtaki
Kalamatianos
Syrtos
Pyrrhichios
Serra

Greek dances